Oleg Olegovich Li (born February 29, 1991) is a Russian professional ice hockey winger who is currently under contract with Avtomobilist Yekaterinburg in the Kontinental Hockey League (KHL).

Playing career
Li previously played in the KHL with Atlant Moscow Oblast, Admiral Vladivostok, Amur Khabarovsk, SKA Saint Petersburg and Ak Bars Kazan. On May 1, 2018, he was traded by Amur to SKA Saint Petersburg in exchange for financial compensation.

During the 2019–20 season, after appearing in one game with SKA, Li was traded to Ak Bars Kazan in exchange for financial compensation on 18 October 2019. He appeared in 29 games with Ak Bars, scoring three goals and nine points, before finishing the season in the VHL with Bars Kazan.

On 1 May 2020, Li was signed as a free agent to a one-year contract with HC Sibir Novosibirsk.

After two seasons in Siberia, Li continued his journeyman career in the KHL, agreeing to a two-year contract with Avtomobilist Yekaterinburg on 3 May 2022.

References

External links

1991 births
Living people
Admiral Vladivostok players
Ak Bars Kazan players
Amur Khabarovsk players
Atlant Moscow Oblast players
Avtomobilist Yekaterinburg players
Fargo Force players
Russian people of Korean descent
HC Sibir Novosibirsk players
SKA Saint Petersburg players
Universiade medalists in ice hockey
Universiade gold medalists for Russia
Competitors at the 2015 Winter Universiade
Russian ice hockey left wingers
Sportspeople from Volgograd